LR-attributed grammars are a special type of attribute grammars. They allow the attributes to be evaluated on LR parsing. As a result, attribute evaluation in LR-attributed grammars can be incorporated conveniently in bottom-up parsing. zyacc is based on LR-attributed grammars. They are a subset of the L-attributed grammars, where the attributes can be evaluated in one left-to-right traversal of the abstract syntax tree. They are a superset of the S-attributed grammars, which allow only synthesized attributes. In yacc, a common hack is to use global variables to simulate some kind of inherited attributes and thus LR-attribution.

External links
 http://www.cs.binghamton.edu/~zdu/zyacc/doc/zyacc_4.html
 Reinhard Wilhelm: LL- and LR-Attributed Grammars. Programmiersprachen und Programmentwicklung, 7. Fachtagung, veranstaltet vom Fachausschuß 2 der GI (1982), 151–164, Informatik-Fachberichte volume 53.
 J. van Katwijk: A preprocessor for YACC or A poor man's approach to parsing attributed grammars. Sigplan Notices 18:10 (1983), 12–15.

Formal languages
Compiler construction